The men's 400 metres sprint event at the 1948 Olympic Games took place between August 4 and August 5. Fifty-three athletes from 28 nations competed. The maximum number of athletes per nation had been set at 3 since the 1930 Olympic Congress. The final was won by Jamaican Arthur Wint coming from almost 10 meters back to catch teammate and world record holder Herb McKenley. This was Jamaica's first Olympic gold medal in any event, and broke a string of 3 straight American victories in the men's 400 metres.

Background

This was the eleventh appearance of the event, which is one of 12 athletics events to have been held at every Summer Olympics. Bill Roberts of Great Britain was the only finalist from 1936 to return after the 12-year gap. Herb McKenley of Jamaica was the "heavy favorite," having recently broken the world record. Top challengers included fellow Jamaican Arthur Wint and American Mal Whitfield (fresh off a win in the 800 metres).

In addition to Jamaica winning gold in its first appearance in the event, Bermuda, Ceylon, Colombia, Cuba, Iceland, Iraq, Turkey, and Yugoslavia competed in the 400 metres for the first time. The United States made its eleventh appearance in the event, the only nation to compete in it at every Olympic Games to that point.

Competition format

The competition retained the basic four-round format from 1920. There were 12 heats in the first round, each with between 3 and 5 athletes. The top two runners in each heat advanced to the quarterfinals. There were 4 quarterfinals of 6 runners each; the top three athletes in each quarterfinal heat advanced to the semifinals. The semifinals featured 2 heats of 6 runners each. The top three runners in each semifinal heat advanced, making a six-man final.

Records
Prior to the competition, the existing World and Olympic records were as follows.

Schedule
All times are British Summer Time (UTC+1)

Results

Round 1

The fastest two runners in each of the twelve heats advanced to the quarterfinals.

Heat 1

Heat 2

Heat 3

Heat 4

Heat 5

Heat 6

Heat 7

Heat 8

Heat 9

Heat 10

Heat 11

Heat 12

Quarterfinals

The fastest three runners in each of the four heats advanced to the semifinal round.

Quarterfinal 1

Quarterfinal 2

Quarterfinal 3

Quarterfinal 4

Semifinals

The fastest three runners in each of the two heats advanced to the final round.

Semifinal 1

Semifinal 2

Final

McKenley was known for starting fast and stayed true to form in this race, hitting the halfway mark at 21.6 seconds (a split which would have placed him 6th in the final of the 200 metre event itself). Wint, however, powered through the second half and caught McKenley with 20–30 metres to go. Neither Curotta nor any of the Americans had much chance at winning behind the two Jamaicans.

References

External links
Organising Committee for the XIV Olympiad, The (1948). The Official Report of the Organising Committee for the XIV Olympiad. LA84 Foundation. Retrieved 5 September 2016.

Athletics at the 1948 Summer Olympics
400 metres at the Olympics
Men's events at the 1948 Summer Olympics